Jaime Callejas (born 13 October 1940) is a Colombian former sports shooter. He competed in two events at the 1972 Summer Olympics.

References

1940 births
Living people
Colombian male sport shooters
Olympic shooters of Colombia
Shooters at the 1972 Summer Olympics
Place of birth missing (living people)